Sir Hamilton John Goold-Adams,  (27 June 1858, in Jamesbrook, County Cork – 12 April 1920) was an Irish soldier and colonial administrator, who served as Governor of Queensland from 1915 to 1920.

Early life
Born in the townland of Jamesbrook in County Cork, Ireland, fourth son of Richard Wallis Goold-Adams (1802–73) and Mary Sarah Goold-Adams (d. 1899), daughter of Sir William Wrixon-Becher, 1st Baronet.

Military career
Hamilton Goold-Adams was a cadet in the training ship HMS Conway until he decided to join the British Army and was commissioned in the Royal Scots Regiment, serving principally in southern Africa, where he achieved the rank of captain in 1885 and major in 1895, leading many expeditions into the interior. During the Second Boer War he served first as Resident Commissioner in Bechuanaland, Afterwards as commander of the Town Guard during the latter half of the Siege of Mafeking where he was twice Mentioned in Despatches.

Colonial administrator and governor

Goold-Adams was appointed Deputy Commissioner of the Orange River Colony under the Administrator Sir Alfred Milner (later Lord Milner) in January 1901. Following the end of hostilities in May 1902, the colony formally received a new constitution on 23 June, and Goold-Adams was appointed Lieutenant-Governor, serving as such until 1907, when he became governor.

Goold-Adams was made a Companion of the Order of St Michael and St George in 1902, and was advanced to Knight Grand Cross of the Order of St Michael and St George in 1907.

Goold-Adams returned to England in 1911, where he married a Canadian named Elsie Riordon on 4 July. Later that year he was appointed British High Commissioner to Cyprus. In 1914 he was made Governor of Queensland, and arrived in Brisbane just before the election of Queensland's first majority Labor government, under Premier T. J. Ryan. He occasionally disapproved of Labor's policies and majority appointments to the Legislative Council of Queensland.

Returning to England after his retirement, Goold-Adams contracted pleurisy on board ship, and died in Cape Town, South Africa in 1920.

Personal life
Upon his return from South Africa on 4 July 1911, he married Elsie Riordan of Montreal, Canada; they had two children.

References

D. J. Murphy, 'Goold-Adams, Sir Hamilton John (1858–1920)', Australian Dictionary of Biography, Volume 9, Melbourne University Press, 1983, p. 50.
Elizabeth Main: Man of Mafeking: The Bechuanaland Years of Sir Hamilton Goold-Adams, 1884–1901, Botswana Society (Botswana), 1996.

1858 births
1920 deaths
Governors of Queensland
Royal Scots officers
Knights Grand Cross of the Order of St Michael and St George
Companions of the Order of the Bath
People from County Cork
British colonial army officers
British military personnel of the Second Boer War
Respiratory disease deaths in South Africa
High Commissioners of the United Kingdom to Cyprus
Commissioners of the Bechuanaland Protectorate
Presidents of the Southern Africa Association for the Advancement of Science